Nilotpal Mrinal (born 25 December 1984) is an Indian author, poet, socio-political activist and social media influencer. He is known for his books Dark Horse, Aughad and upcoming novel Yaar Jadugar.  In 2016, he was awarded India's Sahitya Akademi Award.

Early life and education 
Mrinal was born on 25 December 1984 in Dumka district, Jharkhand. He attended high school in Nonihat and graduated from St. Xavier's College, Ranchi in 2005. He moved to New Delhi in 2008, where he began preparing to enter civil service and had given the Civil Services Examination (CSE) several times.

Career 
Mrinal's first novel, Dark Horse, was published in 2015. Written in Hindi, it depicts the difficulties of leaving village life for that of the city, and is set against the backdrop of Mukherjee Nagar, Delhi. It received the Sahitya Akadami Youth Award in 2016.

Four years later he released a second novel, Aughad. Recently Mrinal released his third novel 'Yar Jadugar'. 

He also writes poetry and folk songs, and has appeared as a motivational speaker for TED (conference) and Josh Talks.

Notable works

Novels 
 Dark Horse (2015)
 Aughad (2019)
Yaar Jaadugar (2021)

Audiobooks/series 
 Jakhbaba (2019) for Storytel Originals
 Darling Democracy (2020) for Audible

Poetry and songs 
 Duniya Esi Hua Karti Thi
 Chal Sadho Koi Desh
 Hum Bihar Hain
Ab To Lagta Hai Desh Veerana
Hum Hi To Kal Itihaas Likhenge
O Maa Ye Duniya 
Jagat Mati Ka Dhela Re

Bhojpuri poetry and songs 
 Jagmag Kare i sansar

References 

Hindi-language writers
1984 births
Living people